Yuko Taniguchi (born in Yokohama, Japan) is a Japanese American poet, and novelist.

Life
She graduated from the College of Saint Benedict and Saint John's University and from the University of Minnesota with a M.F.A.

She teaches at University of Minnesota.

Awards
 2008 American Book Award (The Before Columbus Foundation)
 Finalist, The Dayton Literary Peace Prize 
 Finalist, 11th Annual Asian American Literary Awards
 2008 Kiriyama Prize Notable Book
 15th Annual Skipping Stones Honor Awards
 Finalist, Literary Fiction category for ForeWord Magazine's Book of the Year Awards
 Honorable Mention, The 2007 Gustayus Myers Center Outstanding Book Awards Advancing Human Rights

Works

Poetry

Novels

References

External links
"Author's website"
"University of Minnesota, Rochester Faculty page

1975 births
Living people
21st-century American novelists
American poets
American poets of Asian descent
American women writers of Asian descent
American women novelists
University of Minnesota faculty
University of Minnesota alumni
American writers of Japanese descent
People from Yokohama
Japanese emigrants to the United States
American novelists of Asian descent
21st-century American women writers
21st-century American poets
American women poets
American Book Award winners
Novelists from Minnesota
American women academics